David McWilliams may refer to:

David McWilliams (American football) (born 1942), American football coach at the University of Texas and Texas Tech
David McWilliams (economist) (born 1966), Irish broadcaster and commentator
David McWilliams (musician) (1945–2002), best known for his song "Days of Pearly Spencer"
Dave MacWilliams, soccer coach